Emmerich Hanus (24 August 1884 – 20 November 1956) was an Austrian actor and film director. He appeared in 22 films between 1913 and 1949. His older brother was actor and film director Heinz Hanus.

Selected filmography
 The Other (1913)
 The Final Mask (1924)
 A Free People (1925)
 The Eleven Schill Officers (1926)
 That Was Heidelberg on Summer Nights (1927)
 The Hour of Temptation (1936)
 It's Only Love (1947)

References

External links

1884 births
1956 deaths
Austrian male film actors
Austrian male silent film actors
Austrian film directors
20th-century Austrian male actors
Film people from Vienna